In order theory, a continuous poset is a partially ordered set in which every element is the directed supremum of elements approximating it.

Definitions 
Let  be two elements of a preordered set . Then we say that  approximates , or that  is way-below , if the following two equivalent conditions are satisfied.
 For any directed set  such that , there is a  such that .
 For any ideal  such that , .
If  approximates , we write . The approximation relation  is a transitive relation that is weaker than the original order, also antisymmetric if  is a partially ordered set, but not necessarily a preorder. It is a preorder if and only if  satisfies the ascending chain condition.

For any , let

Then  is an upper set, and  a lower set. If  is an upper-semilattice,  is a directed set (that is,  implies ), and therefore an ideal.

Properties

The interpolation property 
For any two elements  of a continuous preordered set ,  if and only if for any directed set  such that , there is a  such that . From this follows the interpolation property of the continuous preordered set : for any  such that  there is a  such that .

Continuous dcpos 
For any two elements  of a continuous dcpo , the following two conditions are equivalent.
Using this it can be shown that the following stronger interpolation property is true for continuous dcpos.

For a dcpo , the following conditions are equivalent.
  is continuous.
In this case, the actual left adjoint is

Continuous complete lattices 
For any two elements  of a complete lattice ,  if and only if for any subset  such that , there is a finite subset  such that .

Let  be a complete lattice. Then the following conditions are equivalent.
  is continuous.
  is isomorphic to the image of a Scott-continuous idempotent map  on the direct power of arbitrarily many two-point lattices .

A continuous complete lattice is often called a continuous lattice.

Examples

Lattices of open sets 
For a topological space , the following conditions are equivalent.
  is an exponentiable object in the category  of topological spaces. That is, the functor  has a right adjoint.

References

External links 
 
 
 
 
 
 

Order theory